Torben is a Danish variant of the given name Torbjörn.

People named Torben include:

Torben Betts (born 1968), English playwright and screenwriter
Torben Boye (born 1966), Danish former footballer
Torben Frank (born 1968), Danish former football striker
Torben Grael (born 1960), Brazilian sailor and twice Olympic gold medalist
Torben Hoffmann (born 1974), German former football defender
Torben Joneleit (born 1987), Monegasque-born German footballer
Torben Larsen (born 1942), Danish scientist in the field of hydrology and water pollution
Torben Meyer (1884-1975), Danish character actor
Torben Nielsen (born 1945), Danish former football player and manager
Torben Oxe (died 1517), Danish nobleman controversially executed for murder
Torben Piechnik (born 1963), Danish former football defender
Torben Schousboe (1937–2017), Danish music researcher and writer
Torben Skovlyst, Danish orienteering competitor

See also
Torbern Bergman (1735-1784), Swedish chemist and mineralogist
Turbin
Thoburn
Thorburn
Thulborn

Danish masculine given names